The 2005 PGA Championship was the 87th PGA Championship, played August 11–15 at the Baltusrol Golf Club Lower Course in Springfield, New Jersey, west of New York City. Phil Mickelson earned his first PGA Championship and second major title by flopping a chip out of deep rough to 2 feet (0.6 m) for birdie on the final hole for a one-shot victory over runners-up Steve Elkington and Thomas Bjørn. The purse was $6.5 million with a winner's share of $1.17 million.

It was the first PGA Championship held at Baltusrol, which had hosted the U.S. Open seven times, and was the first major championship at Baltusrol since the 1993 U.S. Open, won by Lee Janzen.

Field
All former PGA Champions 
Winners of the last five U.S. Opens (2001-2005) 
Winners of the last five Masters (2001-2005) 
Winners of the last five British Opens (2001-2005) 
The 2005 Senior PGA Champion 
The low 15 scorers and ties in The 2004 PGA Championship 
The 25 low scorers in The 2005 PGA Club Professional Championship 
The 70 leaders in official money standings from the 2004 International through the 2005 Buick Open 
Members of the 2004 United States Ryder Cup Team 
Winners of tournaments co-sponsored or approved by the PGA Tour and designated as official events from The 2004 PGA Championship to The 2005 PGA Championship. (Does not include pro-am or team competitions). 
In addition, The PGA of America reserves the right to invite additional players not included in the categories above. 
The 156-player field will be filled (in order) by those players below 70th place in official money standings from the 2004 International through the 2005 Buick Open.

Full eligibility list

Course layout
 
Lower Course

Source:

Lengths of the course for previous major championships:

, par 70 - 1993 U.S. Open
, par 70 - 1980 U.S. Open
, par 70 - 1967 U.S. Open
, par 70 - 1954 U.S. Open

, par 72 - 1936 U.S. Open (Upper Course)
, par 74 - 1915 U.S. Open (Old Course)
, par      - 1903 U.S. Open (Old Course)The Old Course was plowed under in 1918

Round summaries

First round
Thursday, August 11, 2005

There was a logjam up at the top upon the conclusion of the first round with twenty seven players within two shots of the lead. Six players including Phil Mickelson shot three under 67s for a one shot lead over the rest of the field. Defending champion Vijay Singh shot an even par 70 to lie three shots off the pace.

Second round
Friday, August 12, 2005

Phil Mickelson opened up a three shot lead after shooting a five under 65, the low round of the day. Jerry Kelly also shot 65 to lie sole second. Tiger Woods shot a one under 69 to make the cut line that was set at four over par. Notable players missing the cut included: Colin Montgomerie, 2003 champion Shaun Micheel and 2002 champion Rich Beem.

Third round
Saturday, August 13, 2005

Phil Mickelson struggled throughout much of the third round as he shot a two over 72 but it was still enough for a share of the lead with Davis Love III. Love shot his third straight 68 to make the final pairing of a major for the first time since the 2003 Open Championship. The round of the day belonged to Thomas Bjørn who matched the major championship record with a 63. It was the third 63 at Baltusrol, where Jack Nicklaus and Tom Weiskopf did it in the first round of the 1980 U.S. Open. Vijay Singh lay just two shots back after a 69 which included 17 pars before a birdie on 18.

Final round
Sunday, August 14, 2005

The final round was not finished on Sunday for the first time since 1986. Rain delayed much of the action, which ended with Tiger Woods as the clubhouse leader at two under. Phil Mickelson was putting for par on the 14th hole when play was suspended at 6:35 p.m. EDT. Thomas Bjørn with four holes left and Steve Elkington with three holes left were one shot off of Mickelson.  Despite being the clubhouse leader, Woods returned to his Florida home on Sunday night rather than await the tournament's completion the following day. This move was heavily criticized at the time.

Monday, August 15, 2005

Play resumed Monday at 10:05 a.m., with six players on the course within three shots of the lead. Headed to the 72nd hole, Phil Mickelson was tied for the lead at three under with Thomas Bjørn and Steve Elkington. Mickelson birdied the par 5 18th to win his second major title. Elkington and Bjorn both missed birdie putts and had to settle for par on the  closing hole. Mickelson became the seventh wire-to-wire winner (though he shared the lead after the first and third rounds) at the PGA Championship and the first since Tiger Woods in 2000. The round of the day belonged to Ted Purdy, who ended up in a tie for tenth after a final round 66.

Source:

Scorecard
Final round

Cumulative tournament scores, relative to par

Source:

References

External links
2005 PGA Championship official site
Coverage on European Tour's official site
Baltusrol Golf Club

PGA Championship
Golf in New Jersey
Springfield Township, Union County, New Jersey
PGA Championship
PGA Championship
PGA Championship